John Robert Bainbridge (1880 in Seaham, County Durham – 17 January 1960 in  Sunderland, County Durham) was a professional footballer who played as a forward for three Southern League clubs between 1903 and 1910.

Football career
Bainbridge started his footballing career in the North East with Silksworth and Sunderland Royal Rovers, before turning professional with Glossop in May 1903.

In the summer of 1904 he moved South to join Reading where he spent two seasons before joining Portsmouth in 1906. After a season at Portsmouth, he moved along the South coast to join Southampton in May 1907.

According to Holley & Chalk's The Alphabet of the Saints, Bainbridge was "a reliable performer. His right-wing partnership with Frank Jefferis drew favourable comparisons with the famed duo of Wood and Turner seven years earlier".

In Saints' FA Cup run in 1908, in which they reached the semi-finals, he scored 4 goals in 6 games. Ill health ended his career at The Dell and he returned to his native North-East where, after playing briefly for Hartlepools United, he returned to his original occupation as coal-miner.

References

1880 births
1960 deaths
Sportspeople from Seaham
Footballers from County Durham
Hartlepool United F.C. players
Portsmouth F.C. players
Reading F.C. players
Southampton F.C. players
Southern Football League players
Association football forwards
English footballers
Glossop North End A.F.C. players